The 1932 Arizona State Bulldogs football team was an American football team that represented Arizona State Teachers College (later renamed Arizona State University) in the Border Conference during the 1932 college football season. In their third and final season under head coach Ted Shipkey, the Bulldogs compiled a 4–3–1 record (2–2–1 against Border opponents) and outscored their opponents by a combined total of 182 to 92. The team captain was guard Paul Griffin.  The Bulldogs finished 3–2 at home and 1–1–1 on the road.  Home games were played at Irish Field in Tempe, Arizona.

Schedule

Game summaries
On September 24, Arizona State opened its season with a 99–0 victory over the Casa Blanca Indians at Irish Field.

On October 1, the team lost to the Whittier College Poets, 26-0, at Irish Field.  It was the first meeting between the two football programs.

On October 15, the Bulldogs played to a 6-6 tie with Arizona State Teachers College at Flagstaff ("Flagstaff", later renamed Northern Arizona University) before a homecoming crowd in Flagstaff.

On Friday night, October 21, Arizona defeated Arizona State, 20-6, in their annual rivalry game played in Tucson.

On November 5, the Bulldogs defeated New Mexico A&M (later renamed New Mexico State University) in a 7-6 road victory in Las Cruces, New Mexico.

On Friday, November 11, Arizona State defeated College of Mines and Metallurgy of the University of Texas (later renamed University of Texas at El Paso) by a 15-14 score in Tempe.

On Thursday, November 24 (Thanksgiving Day), Arizona State lost to Flagstaff, 20-6, at Irish Field in Tempe.

On December 3, the Bulldogs closed their season with an impressive 43-0 home shutout victory over New Mexico.  It was the first meeting between the two football programs.

Roster
The usual Arizona State lineup included left end Landon Hardesty, left tackle Anson Cooper, left guard Clarence Sexton, center Reid Calicoat, right guard Paul Griffin, right tackle Don Pace, right end Vernon Tuckey, quarterback Cyrus Morris, halfbacks Norris Steverson and Park Schuler, and fullback Voman Fry.

Bill Baxter and Bill Boyle were also on the roster.

References

Arizona State
Arizona State Sun Devils football seasons
Arizona State Sun Devils football